The 1977 Soviet Chess Championship was the 45th edition of USSR Chess Championship. Held from 28 November to 22 December 1977 in Leningrad. Boris Gulko and Josif Dorfman shared the title after tying in the play-off. The qualifying tournaments took place in Bălți and Baku.

Qualifying

Swiss Qualifying 
The Swiss Qualifying was held in Bălți from 25 August to 14 September 1977 with 64 players. Lev Alburt won gaining a direct promotion to the
final.

First League 
The top six qualified for the final.

Final 
The final at Leningrad featured the qualifiers plus the players who entered directly for the historical performance in previous championships.

Play-off

References 

USSR Chess Championships
Chess
1977 in chess
Chess